The 1995 Bremen state election was held on 14 May 1995 to elect the members of the Bürgerschaft of Bremen, as well as the city councils of Bremen and Bremerhaven. The incumbent coalition was a traffic light coalition of the Social Democratic Party (SPD), The Greens, and the Free Democratic Party (FDP) led by Mayor Klaus Wedemeier. The coalition was defeated as the FDP lost its representation in the Bürgerschaft. The SPD narrowly remained the most popular party, though they tied with the Christian Democratic Union (CDU) in number of seats won. The major winner of the election was Labour for Bremen and Bremerhaven (AFB), a splinter from the SPD formed in January 1995 which espoused economic liberalism. The party entered the Bürgerschaft with 10.7% of votes cast and 12 seats.

After the election, Mayor Wedemeier resigned. The SPD and CDU subsequently formed a grand coalition under new SPD Mayor Henning Scherf.

Parties
The table below lists parties represented in the previous Bürgerschaft of Bremen.

Election result

|-
! colspan="2" | Party
! Votes
! %
! +/-
! Seats
! +/-
! Seats %
|-
| bgcolor=| 
| align=left | Social Democratic Party (SPD)
| align=right| 115,001
| align=right| 33.4
| align=right| 5.4
| align=right| 37
| align=right| 4
| align=right| 37.0
|-
| bgcolor=| 
| align=left | Christian Democratic Union (CDU)
| align=right| 112,301
| align=right| 32.6
| align=right| 1.9
| align=right| 37
| align=right| 5
| align=right| 37.0
|-
| bgcolor=| 
| align=left | Alliance 90/The Greens (Grüne)
| align=right| 44,977
| align=right| 13.1
| align=right| 1.7
| align=right| 14
| align=right| 3
| align=right| 14.0
|-
| bgcolor=#63B8FF| 
| align=left | Labour for Bremen and Bremerhaven (AFB)
| align=right| 36,735
| align=right| 10.7
| align=right| New
| align=right| 12
| align=right| New
| align=right| 12.0
|-
! colspan=8|
|-
| bgcolor=| 
| align=left | Free Democratic Party (FDP)
| align=right| 11,607
| align=right| 3.4
| align=right| 6.1
| align=right| 0
| align=right| 10
| align=right| 0
|-
| bgcolor=| 
| align=left | German People's Union (DVU)
| align=right| 8,503
| align=right| 2.5
| align=right| 3.7
| align=right| 0
| align=right| 6
| align=right| 0
|-
| bgcolor=| 
| align=left | Party of Democratic Socialism (PDS)
| align=right| 8,174
| align=right| 2.4
| align=right| 2.4
| align=right| 0
| align=right| ±0
| align=right| 0
|-
| bgcolor=|
| align=left | Others
| align=right| 7,142
| align=right| 2.1
| align=right| 
| align=right| 0
| align=right| ±0
| align=right| 0
|-
! align=right colspan=2| Total
! align=right| 344,440
! align=right| 100.0
! align=right| 
! align=right| 100
! align=right| ±0
! align=right| 
|-
! align=right colspan=2| Voter turnout
! align=right| 
! align=right| 68.6
! align=right| 3.6
! align=right| 
! align=right| 
! align=right| 
|}

References
 Bürgerschaft Bremen seit 1945

Elections in Bremen (state)
Bremen
May 1995 events in Europe